"Gone" is a 2004 single by TobyMac from his album Welcome to Diverse City.  It stayed at number 1 on R&R magazine's Christian CHR chart for 10 weeks. The song peaked at No. 29 on Billboard's Hot Christian Songs chart. It charted for 10 weeks. The song is played in a D-flat major key, and 163 beats per minute.

A remix is found on McKeehan's album Renovating Diverse City. The song is also featured in WOW Hits 2005.

Track listing
Digital download (Long Gone remix)
"Gone" – 3:35

Digital download (Double take)
"Gone" – 3:26

Music video
The music video for the single "Gone" was released in 2004.

Charts

References

TobyMac songs
Songs written by TobyMac
2004 songs
Songs written by Christopher Stevens (musician)
ForeFront Records singles